Henrique Guedes da Silva (born 6 March 1972), known as Catanha, is a former professional footballer who played as a striker, and the manager of CD Nerja.

He played almost exclusively for modest clubs in his native Brazil (seven teams in total), except for a brief spell with Atlético Mineiro. He competed in Spain during 12 seasons, most notably with Celta, amassing La Liga totals of 148 matches and 62 goals in five years.

Catanha represented the Spain national team.

Club career
Catanha was born in Recife. After having played with modest clubs in his native country, he arrived in 1995 in Portugal to play for C.F. Os Belenenses, teaming up with countryman Everton Giovanella with whom he would later play in two teams in Spain; there, he started competing in the second division, with UD Salamanca and CD Leganés.

Moving to Málaga CF for the 1998–99 season, Catanha contributed with 26 goals to the Andalusia side's La Liga promotion, and also won the Pichichi Trophy. He scored a further 24 in 1999–2000's top flight, tied for second with Atlético Madrid's Jimmy Floyd Hasselbaink.

Catanha joined RC Celta de Vigo in July 2000, being an instrumental part of the Galicians' domestic and European exploits in a three-year span. However, when the club played UEFA Champions League in the 2003–04 campaign, he only backed up Savo Milošević, and also suffered team relegation.

After that Catanha went pretty much unnoticed, representing FC Krylia Sovetov Samara, Belenenses, Marília Atlético Clube and Clube Atlético Mineiro. In January 2006 he returned to Spain, playing with modest CD Linares (third level, two-and-a-half seasons) and Unión Estepona CF (division four).

In early 2010, aged nearly 38, Catanha returned to his nation of birth, resuming his career in the lower leagues. After a career lasting well into his 40s and playing with his son Pedro at UD Dos Hermanas San Andrés, he finally retired from football in 2017, after a stint at Club Atlético Estación.

Catanha was announced as manager of Gibraltar Second Division side Leo F.C. in June 2017, but he resigned before appearing in a competitive game. He then became CD Estepona's director of football.

International career
Catanha earned three caps for Spain – all in 2000 – despite being born in Brazil. His debut came on 7 October in a 2002 FIFA World Cup qualifier against Israel, coming on as a 71st-minute substitute for Ismael Urzaiz in a 2–0 home win.

Catanha was one of five black or mixed-race players to have played for Spain along with Thiago Alcântara, Donato, Vicente Engonga and Marcos Senna, all but the third being Brazilian nationals.

See also
List of Spain international footballers born outside Spain

References

External links
 
 
 
 
 
 

1972 births
Living people
Sportspeople from Recife
Brazilian emigrants to Spain
Brazilian footballers
Spanish footballers
Association football forwards
Campeonato Brasileiro Série A players
Campeonato Brasileiro Série B players
União São João Esporte Clube players
Centro Sportivo Alagoano players
Paysandu Sport Club players
Marília Atlético Clube players
Clube Atlético Mineiro players
Sport Club Corinthians Alagoano players
Primeira Liga players
C.F. Os Belenenses players
La Liga players
Segunda División players
Segunda División B players
Tercera División players
Divisiones Regionales de Fútbol players
UD Salamanca players
CD Leganés players
Málaga CF players
RC Celta de Vigo players
CD Linares players
Russian Premier League players
PFC Krylia Sovetov Samara players
Spain international footballers
Brazilian expatriate footballers
Brazilian expatriate sportspeople in Portugal
Expatriate footballers in Portugal
Brazilian expatriate sportspeople in Spain
Expatriate footballers in Spain
Brazilian expatriate sportspeople in Russia
Expatriate footballers in Russia
Naturalised citizens of Spain
Naturalised association football players